Highway 9 (AR 9) is a designation for two north–south state highways in Arkansas. A southern segment of  begins at U.S. Route 79 at Eagle Mills and heads north to U.S. Route 67 in Malvern before terminating. The northern segment of  runs from AR 5 to U.S. Route 63 in Mammoth Spring. The route was created during the 1926 Arkansas state highway numbering, and has seen only minor extensions and realignments since. Pieces of both routes are designated as Arkansas Heritage Trails for use during the Civil War and the Trail of Tears.

The AR 9 designation also extends to two spur routes and one business route. All routes are maintained by the Arkansas Department of Transportation (ArDOT).

Route description

Eagle Mills to Malvern
Highway 9 begins at US 67 in Malvern and heads south through Lono, Tulip, and Princeton before heading slightly west. The route then passes through Holly Springs and past numerous quarries before terminating at US 79 at Eagle Mills.

Crows to Mammoth Spring

AR 9 begins at Crows and runs north, with AR 298 shooting east from the route. Continuing north into Perry County, AR 9 meets AR 10 at Williams Junction with AR 216 detaching near Harris Rake. The route next meets AR 60 in Perryville before entering Conway County. The route runs with AR 113 and AR 247 briefly south of Morrilton before meeting US 64 and I-40. AR 9 has a spur and business route in Morrilton. AR 915 strays from AR 9 near Overcup Lake. AR 9 also runs with AR 92 from Birdtown to Center Ridge in Conway County. AR 9 concurs with US 65 from Choctaw to Clinton. The route continues to Shirley from Clinton with AR 16, where it is crossed by AR 110. Entering Stone County, AR 9 runs north for several miles before meeting AR 66 in Mountain View. It exits town northbound with AR 5 and AR 16. AR 9 arrows east in Izard County, passing AR 933, a former alignment of AR 9. The route mostly follows the White River in eastern Izard County. AR 9 detaches a spur route and meets AR 69 in Melbourne. The route then meets AR 56 in Brockwell before leaving the county. The route enters its final county, meeting AR 395 before meeting US 62/US 412 and US 62 BUS in Salem. The route trails northeast to Mammoth Spring, where it meets US 63 and terminates, near the Missouri state line.

History

AR 9 was one of the original state highways, designated in 1926. State Road 9 ran from US Highway 167 (US 167) at Vanduzer to Malvern, and US 70 at Crows to Mammoth Spring. In September 1928, the southern terminus was relocated to US 167 at Eagle Mills. The highway was rerouted south of Clinton over a short section of AR 130 near US 65 in 1953. In 1972, a bypass was built around Morrilton, with the former alignment becoming AR 9B.

Major intersections
Mile markers reset at some concurrencies.

Auxiliary routes

Melbourne spur

It is known colloquially as Circle Drive and Main Street.

The route was created in January 1974 along Main Street, and extended south along Circle Drive in 1985.

Major intersections

Morrilton business route

Route description
AR 9B begins at AR 9 in northeast Morrilton near the parent route's junction with I-40. The route curves southwest along the edge of the University of Arkansas Community College at Morrilton campus before serving as the eastern terminus of AR 132, known as University Boulevard. AR 9B continues southwest through a commercial area with residential subdivisions until intersecting AR 247 (Poor Farm Road) near Morrilton High School. AR 9B continues west for two blocks before turning south onto Saint Joseph Street toward downtown Morrilton. The Earl Building, a 1926 automotive dealership building listed on the National Register of Historic Places, is located on Saint Joseph Street near the US 64 junction. The route terminates at US 64 (Broadway Street) near the Union Pacific Railroad tracks.

History
The route was created from a former alignment of AR 9 in 1976. On May 14, 1997, the portion of the route south of US 64 was removed from the state highway system and turned back to city maintenance. The turnback was made at the request of the mayor of Morrilton in exchange for extending AR 132 from AR 247 to AR 95.

Major intersections

Morrilton spur

The route was created as an industrial access drive to the Morrilton Packing Company plant at the request of the Conway County judge in 1986. It was initially only  in length, but was extended north due to another industry locating in the Morrilton Industrial Park on January 8, 1987.

Major intersections

See also

 List of state highways in Arkansas

References

External links

009
Transportation in Saline County, Arkansas
Transportation in Perry County, Arkansas
Transportation in Conway County, Arkansas
Transportation in Van Buren County, Arkansas
Transportation in Stone County, Arkansas
Transportation in Izard County, Arkansas
Transportation in Fulton County, Arkansas
Transportation in Hot Spring County, Arkansas
Transportation in Ouachita County, Arkansas
Transportation in Dallas County, Arkansas